Golshiri is a surname. Notable people with the surname include:

Barbad Golshiri (born 1982), Iranian contemporary artist
Houshang Golshiri (1938–2000), Iranian writer, fiction critic, and editor
 Payam Golshiri is the name of Al-Mashi, in 2020 TV serie Messiah

Persian-language surnames